Marriage is a 1936 Soviet comedy film directed by Erast Garin.

Plot 
The film is based on eponymous play by Nikolay Gogol.

Starring 
 Erast Garin as Podkolesin
 Stepan Kayukov as Kochkaryov
 Aleksei Matov as Anuchkin
 A. Chekayevsky as Starikov
 Nina Latonina as Agafya
 Zoya Fyodorova as Dunyasha
 Vera Streshnyova as Arina (as V. Streshneva)
 Olga Tomilina as Fyokla

References

External links 

1936 films
1930s Russian-language films
Soviet comedy films
1936 comedy films
Soviet black-and-white films